Engelsberg Ironworks is an ironworks in Ängelsberg, a village in Fagersta Municipality in Västmanland, Sweden. It was built in 1681 by Per Larsson Gyllenhöök (1645-1706) and developed into one of the world's most modern ironworks in the period 1700–1800. It is listed as a UNESCO World Heritage Site since 1993.

Name 
Engelsberg Ironworks is named after Englika. Englika, who was born in Germany, began producing iron in Engelsberg in the 14th century.

History 
The history of iron production in the region dates back to at least 13th century. The local peasants both mined the ore and produced the iron using primitive furnaces.

In the end of the 16th century more modern production methods were introduced in Engelsberg and production volumes increased substantially in the following decades.

Description 
The preserved buildings include a manor house, the inspector's house and the smelting house with a blast furnace.

UNESCO World Heritage Site
Engelsberg Ironworks is a UNESCO World Heritage Site. It was added to the list in 1993. The UNESCO comments were:

Gallery

References

External links

UNESCO description

World Heritage Sites in Sweden
Museums in Västmanland County
Industry museums in Sweden
Cultural heritage of Sweden
1681 establishments in Sweden